Phayap Army (  RTGS: Thap Phayap or Payap, northwest) was the Thai force that invaded the Siamese Shan States (present day Shan State, Myanmar) of Burma on 10 May 1942 during the Burma Campaign of World War II.

History

On 8 December 1941, Japanese troops entered Thailand by land and sea. There had been clashes between Thai soldiers and Japanese soldiers in many southern provinces. Finally, the Thai and Japanese governments had negotiated and agreed to a joint war alliance with the Japanese on 25 January 1942. When Thailand joined the Axis powers, the Thai government had to declare war on the Allies and was forced to use military force to support the combat operations of the Imperial Japanese Army (IJA) by moving the troops of the Royal Thai Army (RTA) to capture Kengtung to be the defense of Burma, which was a territory controlled by the British Raj. In addition, the signing of the principle of cooperation between Thailand and Japan (14 December 1941), that the Royal Thai Army was responsible for raising forces to seize the Thai-Burma border, and to maintain the western coast in southern Thailand.

On 21 December 1941, the Thai government and the Japanese government signed a formal alliance agreement that was the Japan-Thai Alliance Pact causing the Royal Thai army to prepare hastily combat force from the two armed forces comprising the Royal Thai Army and the Royal Thai Air Forces (RTAF) across the country. At that time, the Royal Thai army had just finished Franco-Thai War only 7 months, the equipment of many units is in the process of being repaired. The Royal Thai army must hurry to organize an army by the force is divided into 3 main parts were reserve force, Phayap Army, and territorial defense force and with communications. The organization of the Phayap Army uses the 4th Army Circle in Nakhon Sawan as the Headquarters. Which the 4th Army Circle consisted of 1st Signal Battalion (Nakhon Sawan), 10th Artillery Battalion (Nakhon Sawan), 28th Infantry Battalion (Nakhon Sawan), 29th Infantry Battalion (Phitsanulok), 30th Infantry Battalion (Lampang), and 31st Infantry Battalion (Chiang Mai). Division of the Command of the Western Army Has appointed Lieutenant General Luang Sereeruengrit to be general, with the Payap Army Headquarters located at the British Consulate in Lampang Province (in the beginning, located in Nakhon Sawan). As for the command of the Phayap Army, Lieutenant General Charun Rattanakun Seriroengrit (aka Luang Seriroengrit) was appointed as a commander, then set up a headquarter at the British Consulate in Lampang Province (in the beginning, located in Nakhon Sawan). In addition to Lt. Gen. Luang Seriroengrit as commander, there were also other high-ranking military officers included; 
Major General Luang Phairirayordejd Commander of the 2nd Infantry Division, located in Chiang Mai Province.
Major General Phin Choonhavan Commander of the 3rd Infantry Division, located in Chiang Rai Province.
Major General Luang Haansongkhram Commander of the 4th Infantry Division, located in Chiang Rai Province.
Colonel Thwuan Wichaikhatkha Commander of the Cavalry Division, located in Chiang Rai Province
Air Marshal Luang Atuegtevadej Royal Thai Air Force commander
Air Vice Marshal Luang Tevaritpanluek Deputy Royal Thai Air Force commander
Air Vice Marshal Fuen Ronnaphagrad Ritthakhanee Chief of Staff of the Air Force Field and the Phayap Army's commander of the Wings Mixed

Subsequently, the Imperial Japanese Army requested the Thai government to send troops into operation in Shan State (Kengtung) was the invasion of troops into the northernmost area of the former Siamese Shan States, because the Imperial Japanese Army wanted Royal Thai Army to be a right-wing defense against the enemy in the rear for the Imperial Japanese Army in Burma. In early 1942, Chinese forces led by Generalissimo Chiang Kai-shek invaded the former Siamese Shan States, when the Imperial Japanese Army had to invade Burma's territory to the Indian border The Imperial Japanese Army's rear line would become a weak point for British and Chinese troops to attack the Imperial Japanese Army's rear line.

The deployment of the Phayap Army troops to Kengtung faced the same problems as in the Franco-Thai War. Although most of the veterans were experienced at jungle and mountain warfare, but they faced the same problem as in the Franco-Thai War, namely the unpreparedness of combat support and new soldiers with no real combat experience. which in the Greater East Asia War had more problems because the troops had to move long distances into foreign lands with mountainous terrain, tropical dry forest terrain, and inclement weather. As a result, some soldiers in the army fell ill from lack of clothing and medicines.

On 5 June 1942, Major General Phin Choonhavan Commander of the 3rd Infantry Division moved to capture the city of Kengtung, but after a while more than 30 percent of the division's soldiers became ill with malaria and dysentery. Until having to send a telegram for help to the Phayap Army Headquarters to deliver medicines and medical supplies to the soldiers in Kengtung, but with difficult and delayed transportation causing the soldiers to fall ill, up to 50 percent of the whole division. During the 3rd Infantry Division's military occupation of Kengtung, soldiers will have to face disease, also had to face the problem of a shortage of supplies and clothing which in the first phase of the movement of troops of the 3rd Infantry Division from Nakhon Ratchasima Province to Lampang Province each soldier was given only one outfit, because during the Franco-Thai War, the costumes were exhausted.

After capturing all the Shan State areas, The Thai government has established a new Siamese Shan States with Maj. Gen. Phin Choonhavan as governor and promoted from Major General to Lieutenant General. The Royal Thai Armed Forces Supreme Command Headquarters (RTARFSCH) had ordered to establish also set up a field police department to perform administrative duties, law enforcement, maintain order in occupied areas, and suppress the insurgency in the occupied areas. Which these field police sometimes they act in violation of human rights.

Then the Phayap Army began to withdraw from the former Siamese Shan States remaining strength as necessary to support administrative officials, namely the Office of the former Siamese Shan States Military Governor (OSSSMG). Along with the establishment of three courts at Kengtung, Muang Hang, and Muang Sat having the same jurisdiction as provincial courts in Thailand, but the judgments of these three courts are absolute no appeals or petitions. For keeping the peace and law enforcement is the duty of the field police.

When Empire of Japan surrendered on 14 August 1945, the Thai government rushed to declare peace, and returning these territories to the United Kingdom, but in good faith the term "Siamese Shan States" appeared in history only for a short time. The rest of the Phayap Army had to withdraw their forces from the area back to Thailand, and disbanded later.

War crime
After Mom Rajawongse Seni Pramoj, one of the high-ranking members of the Free Thai Movement became prime minister. He issued the War Criminals Act in October 1945 to show the sincerity of Thailand to the people of the world who disagreed with aggression, and represents the independence of the Thai courts to take action against war criminals with the skill of Thai people do not rely on international courts such as Nuremberg or Tokyo. Finally, The Royal Thai Supreme Court ruled that the War Criminals Act of 1945 cannot be retroactive to these individuals, all defendants were acquitted.

Order of battle of Phayap Army 1942 

Phayap Army (Northern Army) - Lieutenant General Charun Rattanakun Seriroengrit
 2nd Infantry Division - Major General Luang Phairirayordejd
 4th Infantry Regiment (Prachinburi) which consisted of
 10th Infantry Battalion (Prachinburi)
 11th Infantry Battalion (Prachinburi)
 12th Infantry Battalion (Prachinburi)
 5th Infantry Regiment which consisted of
 13th Infantry Battalion
 14th Infantry Battalion
 15th Infantry Battalion
 12th Infantry Regiment (Phitsanuloke) which consisted of
 28th Infantry Battalion (Nakhon Sawan)
 29th Infantry Battalion (Phitsanulok)
 33rd Infantry Battalion (Phitsanulok)
 4th Artillery Battalion (Prachinburi)
 5th Artillery Battalion (Prachinburi)
 6th Artillery Battalion
 Attached:
 5th Cavalry Battalion / Cavalry Division
 Tank squadron / Armoured Regiment
 3rd Infantry Division - Major General Phin Choonhavan
 7th Infantry Regiment (Nakhon Ratchasima) which consisted of
 19th Infantry Battalion (Nakhon Ratchasima)
 20th Infantry Battalion (Nakhon Ratchasima)
 21st Infantry Battalion (Nakhon Ratchasima)
 8th Infantry Regiment (Surin) which consisted of
 17th Infantry Battalion
 18th Infantry Battalion
 52nd Infantry Battalion
 9th Infantry Regiment (Ubon Ratchathani) which consisted of
 25th Infantry Battalion (Ubon Ratchathani)
 26th Infantry Battalion (Ubon Ratchathani)
 27th Infantry Battalion (Ubon Ratchathani)
 7th Artillery Battalion (Nakhon Ratchasima)
 8th Artillery Battalion (Nakhon Ratchasima)
 9th Artillery Battalion
 Motorcycle Reconnaissance Squadron
 Tank squadron
 4th Infantry Division - Major General Luang Haansongkhram
 3rd Infantry Regiment (Lopburi) which consisted of
 4th Infantry Battalion (Lopburi)
 6th Infantry Battalion (Lopburi)
 8th Infantry Battalion (Saraburi)
 13th Infantry Regiment (Lampang) which consisted of
 30th Infantry Battalion (Lampang)
 31st Infantry Battalion (Chiang Mai)
 34th Infantry Battalion (Lampang)
 3rd Artillery Battalion
 10th Artillery Battalion (Nakhon Sawan)
 Cavalry Division - Colonel Thwuan Wichaikhatkha
 35th Cavalry Regiment which consisted of
 3rd Cavalry Battalion (Ubon Ratchathani)
 5th Cavalry Battalion (Roi Ed)
 46th Cavalry Regiment which consisted of
 4th Cavalry Battalion (Chanthaburi)
 6th Cavalry Battalion
 Tank Battalion
 12th Independent Cavalry Regiment which consisted of
 1st Cavalry Battalion (Bangkok)
 2nd Cavalry Battalion (Prachinburi)
 35th Infantry Battalion (Chiang Mai)
 1st Engineer Battalion (Ratchaburi)
 2nd Engineer Battalion (Chachoengsao)
 3rd Engineer Battalion
 4th Engineer Battalion
 1st Artillery Battalion (Bangkok)
 11th Artillery Battalion
 Phayap Army AA Battalion
 Phayap Army Transport Battalion
 Phayap Army Water Transport Battalion

Reorganization 
During the fighting, Phayap Army has added the following units by regrouping
 The 17th Infantry Regiment (Battlefield) which consisted of
 32nd Infantry Battalion (Nakhon Sawan)
 35th Infantry Battalion (Chiang Mai)
 39th Infantry Battalion (Nakhon Si Thammarat)

Bad weather forced the early dissolution of the cavalry division and moving the 35th Cavalry Regiment to Roi Et and the 1st Cavalry Battalion (Royal Guard using Australian stallions) back to BKK.

Nevertheless, the RTA created the following units to replace the cavalry units in the Phayap Army:
 11th Heavy Machine Gun Battalion
 1st Machine Gun Battalion
 2nd Machine Gun Battalion
 27th Artillery Battalion
 29th Artillery Battalion

2nd Army 
After peace in Kentung had been restored in 1943, the Royal Thai Army had withdrawn some units of the Phayap Army and created the 2nd Army as a reserve force.

In 1943, RTA created The 2nd Army (Lopburi) which consisted of
 1st Division (Chiang Rak) which consisted of
 1st Infantry Regiment (Bangkok) which consisted of
 1st Infantry Battalion (Royal Guard) (Bangkok)
 3rd Infantry Battalion (Bangkok)
 9th Infantry Battalion (Bangkok)
 2nd Infantry Regiment (Bangkok) which consisted of
 2nd Infantry Battalion (Bangkok)
 7th Infantry Battalion (Bangkok)
 37th Infantry Battalion (Ratburi)
 45th Infantry Battalion (Phetburi)
 1st Cavalry Battalion (Moved out of Phayap Army back to Bangkok after dissolving the 12th Independent Cavalry Regiment due to the diseases which killed Australian horses used by 1st Cavalry Battalion)
 1st Artillery Battalion
 7th Division (Lopburi) consisted of
 19th Infantry Regiment (Bua Chum, Chai Badan district of Lopburi) which consisted of
 58th Infantry Battalion (Bua Chum, Chai Badan district of Lopburi)
 59th Infantry Battalion (Bua Chum, Chai Badan district of Lopburi)
 20th Infantry Regiment (Lom Sak district of Phetchabun)
 60th Infantry Battalion (Lom Sak district of Phetchabun)
 61st Infantry Battalion (Lom Sak district of Phetchabun)
 21st Infantry Regiment (Wang Chomphoo in Lom Kao district of Phetchabun)
 62nd Infantry Battalion (Wang Chomphoo in Lom Kao district of Phetchabun)
 63rd Infantry Battalion (Wang Chomphoo in Lom Kao district of Phetchabun)
 64th Infantry Battalion (Wang Chomphoo in Lom Kao district of Phetchabun)
 12th Infantry Regiment (Moved out of Phayap Army back to Nakhon Sawan) consisted of
 28th Infantry Battalion (Nakhon Sawan)
 65th Infantry Battalion (Nakhon Sawan)
 6th Inf. Reg (Move out of Phayap Army back to Phitsanulok) consisted of
 29th Inf. Bat. (Phitsanulok) - separated from the 12th Inf. Reg
 66th Inf. Bat. (Nakhon Sawan)
 67th Inf. Bat. (Tak)

37th Division 
In 1944, the Royal Thai Army created the following units to help train the Seri Thai (Free Thai Movement).
 37th Division (Nakhon Ratchasima) which consisted of
 107th Infantry Regiment (Nakhon Ratchasima)
 35th Cavalry Regiment (Roi Ed) - move from Phayap Army - consisted of
 3rd Cavalry Battalion (Ubon Ratchathani)
 5th Cavalry Battalion (Roi Et)
 the 108th Infantry Regiment (Udon Thani - Nakhon Phanom)
 the 9th Infantry Regiment (Ubon Ratchathani) - move from Phayap Army
 25th Infantry Battalion  (Ubon Ratchathani)
 26th Infantry Battalion  (Ubon Ratchathani)
 27th Infantry Battalion  (Ubon Ratchathani)

Demobilization 
After the peace declaration on 16 August 1945, the following units of Phayap Army along with war time units were dissolved and demobilized:

30 October 1945: The following units were dissolved and demobilized
 11th Heavy Machine Gun Battalion
 1st Machine Gun Battalion
 2nd Machine Gun Battalion
 27th Artillery Battalion
 29th Artillery Battalion
13 November 1945: The following units were dissolved and demobilized
 Phayap Army HQ
 2nd Army
 7th Division
 37th Division
 18th Mixed Brigade at 4 States of Melayu
 20th Infantry Regiment
 107th Infantry Regiment.
 4th Cavalry Battalion
 6th Artillery Battalion
 14th Artillery Battalion
 32nd Infantry Battalion (Nakhon Sawan)
 33rd Infantry Battalion (Reserved Forces)
 34th Infantry Battalion (Lampang)
 35th Infantry Battalion (Chiang Mai)
 54th Infantry Battalion
 56th Infantry Battalion
 40th Infantry Battalion (Trang)
 41st Infantry Battalion (Songkhla)

Postwar Reorganization 
The postwar reorganization of Royal Thai Army in 1946:
 1st Army Circle (Bangkok) consisted of
 the 1st Infantry Regiment (Royal Guard) (Bangkok) - which consisted of
 1st Infantry Battalion (Royal Guard) (Bangkok)
 3rd Infantry Battalion (Royal Guard) (Bangkok)
 9th Infantry Battalion (Royal Guard) (Bangkok)
 the 11th Infantry Regiment (Bangkok) - Renamed from the 2nd Infantry Regiment - which consisted of
 2nd Infantry Battalion (Bangkok)
 7th Infantry Battalion  (Bangkok)
 37th Infantry Battalion (Ratchaburi)
 45th Infantry Battalion (Phetburi)
 2nd Army Circle (Prachinburi) consisted of
 2nd Infantry Regiment (Lopburi) - Renamed from the 3rd Infantry Regiment consisted of
 4th Infantry Battalion
 6th Infantry Battalion
 8th Infantry Battalion
 12th Infantry Regiment (Prachinburi) - Renamed from the 4th Infantry Regiment consisted of
 10th Infantry Battalion
 11th Infantry Battalion
 12th Infantry Battalion
 3rd Army Circle consisted of
 the 3rd Infantry Regiment (Nakhon Ratchasima) - Renamed from the 7th Infantry Regiment consisted of
 19th Infantry Battalion
 20th Infantry Battalion
 21st Infantry Battalion
 13th Infantry Regiment (Ubon Ratchathani) - Renamed from the 9th Infantry Regiment consisted of
 25th Infantry Battalion (Ubon Ratchathani)
 26th Infantry Battalion (Ubon Ratchathani)
 27th Infantry Battalion (Ubon Ratchathani)
 4th Army Circle consisted of
 4th Infantry Regiment (Nakhon Sawan) which consisted of
 1st Signal Battalion (Nakhon Sawan)
 10th Artillery Battalion (Nakhon Sawan)
 28th Infantry Battalion (Nakhon Sawan)
 29th Infantry Battalion (Phitsanuloke)
 30th Infantry Battalion (Lampang)
 31st Infantry Battalion (Chiang Mai)
 5th Army Circle (Nakhon Si Thammarat) which consisted of
 5th Infantry Battalion (Hat Yai - Songkhla)
 38th Infantry Battalion (Chumporn)
 39th Infantry Battalion (Nakhon Si Thammarat)
 42nd Infantry Battalion (Khok Pho - Pattani)

Air Force 
Royal Thai Air Force commander - Air Marshal Luang Atuegtevadej
Deputy Royal Thai Air Force commander - Air Vice Marshal Luang Tevaritpanluek 
Chief of Staff of the Royal Thai Air Force and the Phayap Army's commander of the Wings Mixed - Air Vice Marshal Fuen Ronnaphagrad Ritthakhanee

90th Combined Wing - unknown number
41st Squadron
 Curtiss Hawk III
42nd Squadron
 Curtiss Hawk III
32nd Squadron
 Vought Corsair V-93s
11th Squadron
 Mitsubishi Ki-30
12th Squadron
 17 Mitsubishi Ki-30
61st Squadron
 Martin 139WS
62nd Squadron
 Mitsubishi Ki-21-I

See also
Japanese conquest of Burma
Thailand in World War II
Saharat Thai Doem

References

Sources
 Thailand
  The Northern Campaign
 Phayap Army
 สงครามมหาเอเซียบูรพา - จากวันวีรไทย ถึง วันประกาศสงคราม (Thai)
 ประวัติศาสตร์การสงครามของไทยในสงครามมหาเอเซียบูรพา, กรมยุทธศึกษาทหาร กองบัญชาการทหารสูงสุด. 2540 (Thai)
 กองทัพไทยจัดกําลังพลไปรบในสงครามมหาเอเชียบูรพา
 ลุยโคลนไปยึดเชียงตุง สถาปนาเป็น “สหรัฐไทยเดิม”! ชิงดินแดนที่เสียไปในสมัย ร.๔-ร.๕ คืนมาได้ครบ!!
 ภาพเก่าเล่าตำนาน : กองทัพญี่ปุ่นไปทำอะไร…ใน‘ลำปาง’ โดย พลเอก นิพัทธ์ ทองเล็ก
 การจัดตั้งกองทัพพายัพ
 การปฏิบัติการของกองทัพพายัพ

Military history of Thailand during World War II
Military units and formations of Thailand
Military units and formations in Burma in World War II